Eleanor Fay McGovern (née Stegeberg; November 25, 1921 – January 25, 2007) was the wife of George McGovern, who served as a U.S. Senator from South Dakota from 1963 to 1981, and was the Democratic presidential nominee in 1972.

Early life and education
Born in Woonsocket, South Dakota, she grew up on her family's farm. Her mother died when she was only 12, leaving her and her twin sister, Ila (1921–1996), responsible for the upkeep of the household and the raising of their younger sister, Phyllis (1928–2018). As a teenager, McGovern became interested in political and social issues, and joined debate teams, first at Woonsocket High School and later during her one year at Dakota Wesleyan University.

During one high school debate, in her native Woonsocket, she first met George McGovern, after she and her sister Ila defeated McGovern and his partner. George and Eleanor met again and fell in love, while both were at Dakota Wesleyan, and later became engaged, but initially decided not to marry until World War II ended. However, they chose to marry earlier, on October 31, 1943, while on three-day leave, in a ceremony at a small Methodist church in Woonsocket, with George's father, a Methodist minister, presiding.

Career 
Financial difficulties forced her to withdraw from college, but she soon found work as a legal secretary. Eleanor followed George to a number of training stops, before he was sent into combat overseas as a B-24 bomber pilot stationed in Italy and making runs over Nazi Germany. McGovern's flight crew recommended naming their plane the Dakota Queen after Eleanor.

McGovern was an active political wife; she campaigned for her ailing husband in his 1962 United States Senate race. During the 1972 presidential election, when her husband won the Democratic nomination, she was featured on the cover of Time magazine along with First Lady Pat Nixon. During the campaign, The Eleanor McGovern Cookbook: a Collection of South Dakota Family Favorites was published.

After her husband's resounding loss in the 1972 United States presidential election, and subsequent defeat for a fourth Senate term in 1980, she remained active, particularly in combating world hunger. She was also greatly concerned with issues related to child development, and with the fight against alcoholism, which was a contributing factor in the death of her daughter Teresa in 1994.

Personal life 
Together, the McGoverns had five children: daughters Ann, Susan, Mary, Teresa, and son Steven. She began to suffer from bouts of depression, but continued to assume the major share of household and child-rearing duties during her husband's political career.

McGovern died in Mitchell, South Dakota on January 25, 2007, at the age of 85. She was buried in Rock Creek Cemetery in Washington, D.C.

References

1921 births
2007 deaths
20th-century American memoirists
People from Woonsocket, South Dakota
American women memoirists
Dakota Wesleyan University alumni
20th-century American women
21st-century American women
Burials at Rock Creek Cemetery